"Let's Get Married" is a song by Scottish rock duo the Proclaimers. Released in February 1994, it was the lead single from their third studio album, Hit the Highway. As the title strongly suggests, this is a marriage-themed song. The single charted in the United Kingdom, Austria and Canada.

Music video
Released in the United Kingdom in February 1994, the music video for "Let's Get Married", directed by Lindy Heymann, was filmed in the Mojave Desert and in Las Vegas.

Reception
Peter Galvin of Rolling Stone characterized "Let's Get Married" as "an anything-but-smarmy love song about the joys of matrimony".

Charts

In popular culture
"Let's Get Married" was featured in Season 4 Episode 1 of the BBC Scotland sitcom Two Doors Down in January 2019.

References

1994 singles
1994 songs
The Proclaimers songs
Song recordings produced by Pete Wingfield
Songs about marriage